Mac Conmara (anglicised as MacNamara or McNamara) is an Irish surname of a family of County Clare in Ireland. The McNamara family were an Irish clan claiming descent from the Dál gCais and, after the O'Briens, one of the most powerful families in the Kingdom of Thomond as Lords of Clancullen (a title later divided into East and West families). They are related to the O'Gradys, also descended from the Uí Caisin line of the Dál gCais.

The name began with the chieftain Cumara, of Maghadhair in county Clare. Cumara is a contracted form of Conmara – hound of the sea. His son, Domhnall, who died in 1099, adopted the surname Mac Conmara, or son of Cumara, thus becoming the first of his name. The name has survived relatively unmodified as MacConmara in Irish and anglicised as MacNamara/McNamara.

Naming conventions

The name is a contraction of "Mac Cú Na Mara" meaning "Son of the Hound of the Sea". 
 The name has wide varieties of pronunciations, the most popular being that to United States secretary of Defense, Robert McNamara. The vast majority of people with the name live in the English-speaking world and have since dropped the Irish pronunciation of the name, Mæknəmɛrå.

Background
They were an influential clan in Thomond, building numerous castles across the region indicating their power and influence, such as Knappogue Castle.

Notables
Sioda Cam MacConmara rebuilt Quin Abbey where many members of this clan were subsequently laid to rest.

Donnchadh Ruadh Mac Conmara (1715–1810) was a Jacobite poet.

Sean Buidhe Mac Conmara (c. 1750 – 1836), more commonly known as John "Fireball" MacNamara, is remembered because of his daring exploits and his flair for the dramatic which has since featured in verse and in story.

Persons

References

External links
MacNamara at Library Ireland
McNamara at Araltas

See also 

 Namara

Irish families
Surnames of Irish origin
Anglicised Irish-language surnames